Ladislas Kijno (June 27, 1921 – November 27, 2012) was a French painter.  Born in Warsaw, he moved with his family to France in 1925, settling in the community of Nœux-les-Mines in the Pas-de-Calais.  Before becoming a painter he studied philosophy with Jean Grenier.

In 1991, the French magazine L'Amateur d'Art was devoted to him, with an interview with Jean-Pierre Thiollet entitled "Ladislas Kijno: 'Je suis un moine de l'Art!'" (I'm an Art Monk!)

References

20th-century French painters
20th-century French male artists
Abstract painters
French male painters
21st-century French painters
21st-century French male artists
1921 births
2012 deaths
Polish emigrants to France
French abstract artists